Jag är din krigare ("I Am Your Warrior") (also known as Bjørnens søn ("Son of the Bear") and Nature's Warrior) is a 1997  Swedish/Danish action film directed by Stefan Jarl.

The movie mainly takes place in the nature around Lidköping.

Plot 
Thirteen-year-old Kim feels at home in the wilderness. One night, nature's soul appears to him in the form of an Indian, and designates him nature's protector. Kim decides to remain out in the forest and live off what nature provides. Soon, however, Kim's assignment becomes more serious. He has to try and save as many animals as he can from man's pointless killing, and he will stop at nothing.

Cast 
Robin Milldoff - Kim
John Belindo - The Indian
Jan Malmsjö - Chief of police
Mikael Persbrandt - Hjorth
Peter Harryson - Estate owner
Pierre Lindstedt - Foreman
Anders Granell - Fisher
Lena Nilsson - Mom
Johan Paulsen - Father
Hedvig Hedberg - Sister
Viggo Lundberg - Edward
Ebba Hernevik - Indian girl
Thorsten Flinck - Interrogator
Lakke Magnusson - Guard
Kenneth Milldoff - Excavator driver

External links 

Swedish action films
1997 films
Films directed by Stefan Jarl
1990s Swedish films